"Genesis" is a single by VNV Nation from their album Futureperfect. It was released in 2001, in advance of the album.

It was released in two track listings.

It charted in the German mainstream Media Control charts for two weeks, peaking at no. 67 and was ranked #4 on the German Alternative Charts (DAC) Top 50 singles for 2001.

Track listing 

Genesis 1 (CD, Dependent MIND-029)
"Genesis (Single Version)" - 5:45
"Weltfunk" - 4:39
"Genesis (Icon of Coil Version)" - 7:45
"Genesis (Thomas P. Heckmann Version)" - 5:53

Genesis 2 (CD, Dependent MIND-030)
"Genesis (Single Version)" - 5:47
"Genesis (C92 Version)" - 6:30
"Left Behind" - 4:42
"Genesis (Ivory Frequency Version)" - 8:06

References

VNV Nation songs
2001 singles
2001 songs
Futurepop songs